The women's suffrage movement in Washington was part of the broader Women's suffrage movement in the United States. In the state of Washington, women gained and lost the right to vote repeatedly in the late 19th and early 20th centuries.

The first champion of women's suffrage in Washington Territory was Arthur A. Denny who introduced a bill to the lower house of the territory in 1854, but it lost 8 to 9.

After the loss, the subject went silent for 12 years, until 1866 when the election code used language that could allow for women to vote, because it simply stated that "all white citizens" could vote, Edward Eldridge stood on the house floor and stated that this interpretation included women. For a while many agreed with Eldridge's statement until Mary Olney Brown attempted to cast her vote in Olympia in 1869 and was turned away and told she was not a citizen, in 1870 she tried again and was again denied. At the same time that she was trying to cast her ballot, her sister, Charlotte Olney French and seven other women in 
Grand Mound, Washington cast their ballots successfully.

Harry Morgan of Tacoma was a saloon owner who wanted to make sure that women had no vote, because he feared what they would do for his type of business. He was the backer of the case Harland V. Territory which was the first  to officially deny women the right to vote. George Turner was a powerful voice in this case, because he argued that women should not be allowed on a jury, and that suffrage allowed them to do so, and that they needed to reverse women's suffrage to keep them off the jury.

Another case that kept the right to vote from Washington from was the Nevada Bloomer case. Nevada Bloomer was the wife of a Spokane saloon owner, who cared little about women's suffrage, but was a very dutiful wife. Her husband along with some local judges, devised a plan in which they would send Nevada to vote and then turn her away so that she could bring her case to the supreme court. The movement would do a lot to support the Bloomer case, although Nevada never had any intention of actually pursuing real action; the case was simply a diversion to keep the issue tied up in the courts and stop women from voting for prohibition.

Susan B. Anthony's tour of Washington 
Prominent national suffragist Susan B. Anthony visited the Washington Territory (later Washington state) to campaign for women's suffrage between October 16 and November 10, 1871. On October 17, she gave a speech to the legislature on “The Power of the Ballot” at Olympic Hall in Olympia. She went on to speak at Tumwater, Whidbey Island, Port Townsend, and Seattle, then returned to Olympia November 8 to participate in Washington's first women's suffrage convention and helped draft the constitution for the Washington Territory Woman Suffrage Association (WTWSA).

Washington became the third territory (after Wyoming and Utah) to approve suffrage in 1883, and for a short time women used their ballots to support temperance and other moral causes. The powerful saloon lobby pressured the courts, which in an 1887 decision found the suffrage law unconstitutional. A new measure giving women the vote was defeated along with prohibition when statehood was attained in 1889, although women did win the right to vote in school elections the following year.

Achieving suffrage
In 1909, the Alaska-Yukon-Pacific Exposition put Seattle and Washington State in general in the national spotlight. Both the Washington Equal Suffrage Association and the National American Woman Suffrage Association held their annual conventions in Seattle in July 1909, and July 7 was declared Suffrage Day at the A-Y-P Exposition itself.

References

1854 in women's history
1866 in women's history
History of women's rights
Washington (state) suffrage
History of Washington (state)